Saani Kaayidham is a 2022 Indian Tamil-language action crime film directed by Arun Matheswaran. The film stars Keerthy Suresh and director Selvaraghavan in lead roles. Siddharth Ravipati produced the film while the musical score and cinematography were handled by Sam C. S. and Yamini Yagnamurthy respectively. In the film, a generational curse comes true when Ponni and her family face a senseless act of injustice. She and her brother Sangaiah decide to seek justice.

It was released on Amazon Prime Video on 6 May 2022 and received positive reviews from critics and audience.

Plot
Ponni is a hardworking police constable without any real higher aspirations in life. All she wants is to ensure that her daughter Dhanam is raised well and receives a good education. Ponni's husband Maari, a mill worker, aspires to break free from the rampant caste-issues and poverty in their village by getting involved in local elections. This leads to a minor conflict with one of the mill owner's relatives, Anbu, after which he is fired from the mill. When he returns the next day to apologize and get his job back, the mill owner Perumal and his relatives, driven by their senseless casteism and misogyny, humiliate him by making degroratory remarks about Ponni.

In retaliation, Maari attacks and humiliates them in return. Overcome with shame after being retaliated by a lower-caste person, whom they consider an inferior specimen, Perumal and his relatives burn down Ponni's house while her husband and daughter are sleeping inside. Ponni herself is assaulted by them after her superior officer Deva leads her to them on false pretenses. However, Ponni is left alive since she is a policewoman and her death might lead them to legal trouble for them. When Ponni seeks justice for Maari and Dhanam’s deaths, the culprits use their influence and receives a minor sentence and leave for hiding in order to escape. A traumatized Ponni teams up with her half-brother Sangayya to seek vengeance against the upper-caste landlords.

Ponni was not on good terms with Sangayya due to a past conflict between their respective mothers and grew apart from each other. Sangayya empathizes with Ponni due to a similar incident in his own past and how he formed a close bonding with Dhanam. The duo manage to hunt down and kill the culprits. One of them is killed by his own younger brother Giri due to an inheritance dispute (Giri was also in charge of helping the group hide out in different areas). Giri's blind son, Sudalai (who the duo knew beforehand and was Dhanam's close friend) survived and is taken by Sangayya, despite Ponni's adamant insistence that Sudalai had also assaulted her on that fateful night.

The duo manage to find and finish off Perumal and Deva. Sangayya is seriously wounded after singlehandedly holding off several of Perumal's men. Upon his insistence, Ponni leaves him in the van in order to bring Sudalai, whom she had instructed to hide nearby. The reinforcements led by Giri arrive and chases after the van, which Sangayya had anticipated. Sangayya sacrifices himself by blowing up the van after lighting up several gas cylinders which he had stowed inside, killing the reinforcements and leaving Ponni devastated. After taking some time to recover herself, Ponni leaves with Sudalai, where it is revealed that Sudalai was not involved in the assault and was innocent.

Cast
 Keerthy Suresh as Ponni
 Selvaraghavan as Sangayya
 Kanna Ravi as Maari
 Lizzie Antony as Advocate Rani
 Vinoth Munna as Deva
 Murugadass as Giri
 R. K. Vijay Murugan as Anbu

Production
The shooting of the film was wrapped up on 18 August 2021.

Music
The music of the film was supposed to be composed by Yuvan Shankar Raja, but he was replaced by Sam CS.

Release
The film was released on Amazon Prime Video on 6 May 2022 alongside its dubbed versions in Telugu and Malayalam, with the Telugu version titled Chinni. The film's teaser was released on 22 April 2022. This film was sold by Kalaignar TV.

Reception

Critical reception 
Saani Kaayidham received positive reviews from critics and audience, who praised the cast performances (particularly Suresh and Selvaraghavan), direction, action sequences and technical aspects but received criticism for excessive graphic violence.

M Suganth of The Times Of India rated the film 3 out of 5 stars and wrote "It is ultimately the performances of Keerthi Suresh, who is terrific as the revenge-obsessed Ponni and Selvaraghavan, who superbly turns Sangayya into the film's beating heart, that hold the film aloft and prevent it from sinking into a mindless violent movie". Ashameera Aiyappan of Firstpost rated the film 3 out of 5 stars and wrote "Saani Kaayidham is a solid revenge drama that achieves its humble aspirations". Janani K of India Today rated the film 3 out of 5 stars and wrote "Saani Kaayidham is a neat revenge thriller which lacks depth in writing. If only Arun added more punch to the story, the film could have been flawless". A Reviewer from Pinkvilla rated the film 3 out of 5 stars and wrote "This film is worth watching for the performances by the lead actors, and of course, a story that needs to be told. Latha Srinivasan wrote in Moneycontrol that “Saani Kaayidam' rests firmly on the shoulders of Keerthy Suresh and Selvaraghavan, and works to a great extent only because of them.” Haricharan Pudipeddi of The Hindustan Times stated "The film pushes Keerthy Suresh out of her comfort zone while Selvaraghavan contributes in not making the film end up as a blood-soaked tale of vengeance". Bharathy Singaravel of The News Minute wrote "Filmmakers need to stop, just simply stop using sexual violence as a cinematic prop. Normally, in Tamil films, a woman’s life is “over” after she has been sexually assaulted. Saani Khaayidham tries to deviate from that, but ends up reinforcing another trope - that a woman, who is otherwise primarily the wife, daughter, or mother, needs to go through something as traumatic as a sexual assault to become “stronger”. Srivatsan S of The Hindu wrote "He (Arun Matheswaran) needs to direct his violence towards the audience and not be content with exploiting it for “shock” value. He needs to direct his violence towards making standout sequences".

However, Critic from Dinamani gave mixture of review and noted that "The work of many people can be seen in the way Sanik Kaitham was created. But what would the film have been if all this work had been accompanied by an interesting, mind-blowing story, emotional and innovative scenes!".ABP Nadu Critic gave 3 stars out of 5 and noted that " Apart from the shortcoming that all the pages written in Sanikakitham are in blood, Sanikkaitam is a ‛blood' bond story that travels with relationship and story!" Dinamalar critic gave a mixture of review "It takes courage to see not one but two people who ruined his life take such murderous revenge. Only such people can watch this movie. Make sure children don't watch anything at home."and gave 2.5 rating out of 5  The News Minute critic appreciated the film and gave 3 out of 5 rating.

References

External links 
 

2020s Tamil-language films
2022 films
Amazon Prime Video original films
2022 crime drama films
Films scored by Sam C. S.